Adriaan Justus Enschedé (20 June 1829 in Haarlem – 19 March 1896 in Haarlem) was a Haarlem Archivist, collector, owner of the Joh. Enschedé printing company, philanthropist and a member of Teylers Tweede Genootschap (Teylers Second or Scientific Society).

Biography
Adriaan Justus was the son of Christiaan Justus Enschedé  and his wife Adriana Maria Dalen. He attended the Stedelijk Gymnasium Haarlem and studied law in Leiden, whereupon he joined the family business in Haarlem and brought historical typefaces back into fashion. He became city archivist in 1857 where he wrote an inventory of the archives, still useful today. He wrote several publications on the history of Haarlem, finding inspiration in his work as city archivist publishing the first inventory of the archives of Haarlem. He was a driving force behind the restoration of the St. Bavochurch for which he donated many historical objects including historical stained-glass windows from other locations, and also for the restoration of the ruin of Castle Brederode.

After his death, Adriaan Justus left a significant collection of paintings, drawings, prints, coins, and books behind. He left his Roman coins to the Teylers Museum.

References

Members of Teylers Tweede Genootschap
1829 births
1896 deaths
19th-century Dutch historians
People from Haarlem
Dutch philanthropists
Dutch printers
Dutch numismatists
Joh. Enschedé
19th-century philanthropists
19th-century Dutch businesspeople